Music Inspired by Middle Earth is an album featuring David Arkenstone, released in 2001. The music is based on J.R.R. Tolkien's epic fantasy novel The Lord of the Rings. Even though it was released the same year as The Lord of the Rings: The Fellowship of the Ring, it was not inspired by nor related to the film.

Track listing
"Prelude: Hobbits from the Shire" – 4:08
"The Road to Rivendell" – 3:39
"The Quest" – 5:28
"Moria" – 5:02
"Lothlórien" – 4:18
"Galadriel's Mirror" – 4:32
"The Riders of Rohan" – 4:24
"The Palantír" – 4:50
"Arwen and Aragorn" – 3:29
"To Isengard" – 4:25
"In the Land of Shadow" – 4:22
"The Field of Cormallen" – 3:33
"The Grey Havens" – 3:37
 All tracks composed by Diane and David Arkenstone

Personnel
 David Arkenstone – keyboards, guitars, whistle, flute, melodica, mandolin, bouzouki, percussion
 Diane Arkenstone – keyboards, dulcimer, vocals, bells, synthesizers
 Don Markese – bawu, duduk, bansuri, ocarina
 John Wakefield – percussion
 Erica Foss, Ian Beyer, Adam Loovis, Jackie Randall, Donna Shubert, Sherie Tate, David Watkins, Dawn Davis, Sue Kendall, Daniel McConnell, Angela Niles, Deborah Powell – violins
 Gail Shepherd, Brian Heins, Beverly Langford, Alan Sloan, Barry Simpson, Jennifer Todd – viola
 Beverly Vaughn, Jeffrey Wright – cello
 Allen Frost, Don Sebesky – bass
 Jerome Goldman, David Grady, Joe Nielson, Greg Ryder – French horn
 Jerry Casey, Steve Medina – trumpet
 Janice Everett – oboe, English horn
 Becky Thatcher – harp

2001 albums
David Arkenstone albums
Music based on Middle-earth